August 29 - Eastern Orthodox liturgical calendar - August 31

All fixed commemorations below are observed on September 12 by Eastern Orthodox Churches on the Old Calendar.

For August 30th, Orthodox Churches on the Old Calendar commemorate the Saints listed on August 17.

Feasts

 Afterfeast of the Beheading of St. John the Baptist.

Saints

 Hieromartyr Philonidis (Philoneidis) of Cyprus (3rd century).  (see also: June 17)
 6 Martyrs of Melitene, by drowning.
 16 Monk-martyrs of Thebes, by the sword.
 Saint Bryaene of Nisibis (318)
 Saints Alexander (340), John VIII of Constantinople (595), and Paul the New (784), Archbishops of Constantinople and Ecumenical Patriarchs.
 The Venerable Guardian (Grk.: Ὁ Ὅσιος Φύλαξ).
 Venerable Sarmata of "The Paradise", ascetic of the desert, Egypt (c. 362)
 Saint Eulalius, Bishop of Cyprus (4th century)
 Saint Christopher of Palestine (Christopher the Roman, in Palestine) (6th century)

Pre-Schism Western saints

 Saints Boniface and Thecla, parents of the Twelve Brothers commemorated on September 1 (c. 250)
 Hieromartyr Felix, and Martyrs Fortunatus, Septiminus and Januarius, by beheading (c. 304)
 Saint Pammachius, a Roman senator, married to one of the daughters of St Paula (c. 340-410)
 Saint Loarn, a disciple of St Patrick of Ireland (5th century)
 Saint Rumon, a bishop and patron-saint of Tavistock in England (6th century)
 Saint Agilus (Ail, Aile, Aisle, Ayeul) (c. 580-650)
 Saint Fiacrius (Fiacre, Fiaker, Fèvre), Irish hermit and hospice-founder at Breuil in Brie (c. 670)
 Saints Pelagius, Arsenius and Sylvanus, hermits near Burgos in Old Castile in Spain, martyred by the Saracens. (c. 950)
 Venerable Fantinus of Calabria, the Wonderworker, in Thessalonica (974)
 Saint Bononius, Abbot of Lucedio in Piedmont (1026)
 Saint Peter of Trevi, he preached to the peasants of Tivoli, Anagni and Subiaco (c. 1050)

Post-Schism Orthodox saints

 Synaxis of Serbian Hierarchs:
 Saints Sava I (1235), Arsenius (1266), Sava II (1271), Eustathius I (1285), James (1292), Nicodemus (1325), and Daniel II (1338), Archbishops; 
 Saints Ioannicius II (1354), Spyridon (1388), Ephraim II (1395), Cyril (1419), Nicon (c. 1439), Macarius (1574), and Gabriel I (1659), Patriarchs;
 St. Gregory (1012), Bishop. 
 Saint Alexander, Abbot of Vocha Monastery, near Galich (14th-15th century)
 Repose of St. Alexander, Abbot of Svir (1533)
 Saint Varlaam, Metropolitan of Moldavia (1657)

New martyrs and confessors

 New Hieromartyr Peter, Priest (1918)
 New Hieromartyr Paul, Priest and Virgin-martyr Elizaveta, and Martyr Theodore (1937)
 New Hieromartyr Ignatius (Lebedev), Schema-Archimandrite of the Vysokopetrovsky Monastery (St. Peter’s Monastery), Moscow (1938)
 New Hiero-confessor Peter Cheltsov, Archpriest, of Smolensk (1972)

Other commemorations

 Uncovering of the relics (1652) of St. Daniel, great prince of Moscow (1303)
 Translation of the relics (1724) of St. Alexander Nevsky (Alexis in schema), great prince of Novgorod (1263)
 Translation of the relics of St. Guthlac, Hieromonk of Crowland.  (see also: April 11)

Icon gallery

Notes

References

Sources
 September 12/August 30. Orthodox Calendar (PRAVOSLAVIE.RU).
 September 12 / August 30. HOLY TRINITY RUSSIAN ORTHODOX CHURCH (A parish of the Patriarchate of Moscow).
 August 30. OCA - The Lives of the Saints.
 The Autonomous Orthodox Metropolia of Western Europe and the Americas (ROCOR). St. Hilarion Calendar of Saints for the year of our Lord 2004. St. Hilarion Press (Austin, TX). p. 64.
 August 30. Latin Saints of the Orthodox Patriarchate of Rome.
 The Roman Martyrology. Transl. by the Archbishop of Baltimore. Last Edition, According to the Copy Printed at Rome in 1914. Revised Edition, with the Imprimatur of His Eminence Cardinal Gibbons. Baltimore: John Murphy Company, 1916. p. 263.

 Greek Sources
 Great Synaxaristes:  30 ΑΥΓΟΥΣΤΟΥ. ΜΕΓΑΣ ΣΥΝΑΞΑΡΙΣΤΗΣ.
  Συναξαριστής. 30 Αυγούστου. ECCLESIA.GR. (H ΕΚΚΛΗΣΙΑ ΤΗΣ ΕΛΛΑΔΟΣ).

 Russian Sources
  12 сентября (30 августа). Православная Энциклопедия под редакцией Патриарха Московского и всея Руси Кирилла (электронная версия). (Orthodox Encyclopedia - Pravenc.ru).
  30 августа по старому стилю / 12 сентября по новому стилю. Русская Православная Церковь - Православный церковный календарь на  год.

August in the Eastern Orthodox calendar